The Senior Challenge Cup is the current county cup in the county of Gloucestershire. It is administered by the Gloucestershire County Football Association (GCFA). According to the current rules of the competition, it is open to all clubs whose first affiliation is with the GCFA. The current holders are Bristol City reserves.

History
The Senior Cup and the Challenge Trophy are the only competitions competed across the whole county. Most other challenge cup competitions in the county are competed for by clubs according to their location in the county. County rules state that clubs that are south of Thornbury compete in the southern section and the rest of the county compete in the northern section. None of the affiliated clubs that compete above the fifth tier in the English football league system enter their first teams in the Senior Challenge Cup.

The natural predecessor to the current competition was the Gloucestershire FA Northern Senior Professional Cup, which for its early existence was an annual game held between Gloucester City and Cheltenham Town. Gradually, other local sides were introduced to the competition, but the final was still dominated by the founding two clubs, until Forest Green Rovers in the 1980s and the eventual joining of the Bristol-based clubs in the 1990s to form what we now recognize as the Gloucestershire Senior Cup.

In the early years the cup saw large crowd and great local interest. The largest crowd came at Longlevens where a crowd of 4,221 witnessed Gloucester City defeat Cheltenham Town on 26 April 1951. In recent years, popularity has dwindled with clubs being involved in more prestigious competitions and fielding weakened sides in the competition.

The final was traditionally held at one of the finalists stadiums, but in recent years the final has been played at a neutral in Almondsbury at Oakland Park, which is the headquarters of the Gloucestershire FA.

Finals

Performance by club

Note: 9 tournaments are missing

Trivia
The 1950 final between Gloucester City and Cheltenham Town at Whaddon Road had ended in a 1-1 draw.

A replay was held and, a crowd of 4,115 flocked to Gloucester City's Longlevens ground to witness the match. After normal time, the match had finished 1-1 again and it had been decided to play two 15 minute periods of extra time.

When the score was still 1-1 after the extra time expired, the captains and referee agreed to play a further 20 minute period of extra time, and afterwards, a further 20 minutes as the score was still level - a total of 160 minutes of play.

When the winning goal was scored by Gloucester's Doug Hunt in the 159th minute, the crowd spilled onto the pitch in jubilation, and the match was immediately ended by the referee.

External links
Gloucestershire County FA Official Website

References

County Cup competitions
Football in Gloucestershire